Alice Hanlon Peisch (born October 4, 1954) is an American attorney and politician who has represented the 14th Norfolk District in the Massachusetts House of Representatives since 2003. She is the current Chair of the Joint Committee on Education and a member of the Special Joint Committee on Redistricting.

Prior to being elected to the House, Peisch served as Wellesley, Massachusetts Town Clerk from 2000 to 2003, was a member of Wellesley's School Committee from 1992 to 1999, and was a member of the Wellesley Advisory (Finance) Committee from 1989 to 1992.

See also
 2019–2020 Massachusetts legislature
 2021–2022 Massachusetts legislature

References

1954 births
Democratic Party members of the Massachusetts House of Representatives
People from Wellesley, Massachusetts
Smith College alumni
Suffolk University Law School alumni
Harvard Kennedy School alumni
Living people
20th-century American politicians
Women state legislators in Massachusetts
20th-century American women politicians
21st-century American politicians
21st-century American women politicians